The Lao Red Cross Society is a humanitarian organization in Laos. It was established in 1955.  It has its headquarters in Vientiane.

Since 1992 it has worked extensively at tackling problems with HIV/AIDS in the country and works approximately with 40,000 annually.

References

External links
Official website
Lao Red Cross Profile

1955 establishments in Laos
Red Cross and Red Crescent national societies
Medical and health organizations based in Laos
Organizations established in 1955